Kno, Inc. was a software company that worked with publishers to offer digital textbooks and other educational materials. In November 2013, after raising nearly $100 million in venture capital, the company was acquired by Intel. The website was stopped and the service renamed to Intel Education Study later on.

History 
Founded in May 2009, Kno was headed by CEO Osman Rashid, the co-founder of Chegg, and CTO Babur Habib, a consumer electronics veteran. The firm received funding from Andreessen Horowitz, Intel Capital, Goldman Sachs, FLOODGATE and GSV Capital, and was based in Santa Clara, California.

The company initially announced, in June 2010, a line of tablet computers. Its goal was to offer a "digital textbook/student platform" aimed at the academic market. The textbook tablet was available either with a single panel 14.1" touchscreen or with dual 14.1" touchscreens. The operating system was based on Linux and Webkit.

In April 2011, the company announced that it had licensed its hardware design to Intel and would instead focus on developing software. Two months later, the company released an iPad application, followed by versions for the Galaxy Note 10.1, Android Jelly Bean, Windows 7 & 8, and Web platforms and devices.

In August 2012, the company expanded its catalog of titles from college textbooks to include the K-12 market.

The company was acquired by Intel the following year.

References

External links
Official Site 
 

Computer companies established in 2009
Educational technology companies of the United States
Educational software
Software companies based in California
Defunct software companies of the United States
2009 establishments in California
Software companies disestablished in 2013
2013 disestablishments in California
2013 mergers and acquisitions
Intel acquisitions